Hurricane Ian was the third-costliest weather disaster on record, and the deadliest hurricane to strike the state of Florida since the 1935 Labor Day hurricane. Ian caused widespread damage across western Cuba and the southeast United States, especially the states of Florida, South Carolina, and North Carolina. It was the ninth named storm, fourth hurricane, and second major hurricane of the 2022 Atlantic hurricane season. Ian was the strongest hurricane to hit the state since Hurricane Michael in 2018, the most recent major hurricane to strike the west coast of Florida since Hurricane Irma in 2017, and the strongest category 4 hurricane to hit the region since Hurricane Charley in 2004, which made an identical landfall.

Ian originated from a tropical wave that moved off the coast of Western Africa and across the central tropical Atlantic towards the Windward Islands. The wave moved into the Caribbean Sea on September 21 bringing heavy rain and gusty winds to Trinidad and Tobago, the ABC islands, and the northern coast of South America. It became a tropical depression on the morning of September 23 and strengthened into Tropical Storm Ian early the next day while it was southeast of Jamaica. Rapidly intensifying into a high-end Category 3 hurricane, Ian made landfall in western Cuba. Heavy rainfall caused widespread flooding across Cuba resulting in a nationwide power outage. Ian lost a minimal amount of strength while over land and soon re-strengthened while over the southeastern Gulf of Mexico. It became a high-end Category 4 hurricane, which had sustained winds up to 155 mph (249 km/h) early on September 28, 2022, while progressing towards the west coast of Florida, and made landfall just below peak intensity in Southwest Florida on Cayo Costa Island. It has tied with several other storms becoming the 5th-strongest hurricane on record to make landfall in the contiguous United States. After moving inland, Ian rapidly weakened to a tropical storm before moving back offshore into the Atlantic. It regained intensity and again increased to hurricane strength before making its second landfall in South Carolina. Ian became extratropical shortly after landfall and gradually weakened before dissipating over southern Virginia on October 2.

Hurricane Ian caused at least 160 fatalities with 5 people in Cuba, 149 in Florida, 5 in North Carolina, and 1 in Virginia. Ian caused catastrophic damage with losses estimated to be ~$113 billion. The cities of Fort Myers, Cape Coral, and Naples were particularly hard hit, leaving millions without power in the storm's wake and numerous inhabitants forced to take refuge on their roofs. Sanibel Island, Fort Myers Beach, and Pine Island were decimated by the storm surge, which destroyed nearly all standing structures and damaged both the Sanibel Causeway and the Matlacha bridge to Pine Island, entrapping those left on the islands for several days.

Meteorological history 

A tropical wave producing a large amount of showers and thunderstorms moved off the west coast of Africa on the morning of September 14. The wave subsequently moved westward to the south of the Cape Verde Islands and into a less conducive environment, causing it to lose most of its convection by early September 18. Subsequently, convection began to reform on the wave's axis, and the National Hurricane Center began to track the wave for possible gradual development while it moved westward towards the Windward Islands on September 19. Two days later the disturbance passed over Trinidad and Tobago and entered the southeast Caribbean passing near the ABC Islands and to the northern coast of South America. On September 22, as the disturbance tracked west-northwestward it showed signs of increasing organization. Strong wind shear with  winds generated by the upper-level outflow from Hurricane Fiona inhibited development into a tropical depression. A well-defined circulation was still able to form within the disturbance the same day; its convection then increased and became persistent overnight into the next day. As a result, it was designated Tropical Depression Nine early in the morning on September 23.

At approximately 08:30 UTC on September 27, a rapidly intensifying Ian made landfall on western Cuba as a high-end Category 3 hurricane with sustained winds of 125 mph (205 km/h), becoming the strongest tropical cyclone to impact Pinar del Río Province since Hurricane Gustav in 2008. Ian weakened a little over land but remained a major hurricane as it emerged off the coast of Cuba and into the southeastern Gulf of Mexico around 14:00 UTC. However, its pressure continued to fall as the hurricane grew in size. After completing the eyewall replacement cycle, Ian quickly strengthened and became a very powerful Category 4 hurricane at 09:00 UTC on September 28, with gravity waves propagating from the southwestern quadrant of the convection. Ian maintained its intensity for several hours before weakening slightly as it approached the coast of Florida, although it remained a Category 4 hurricane. Ian then made a second landfall just south of Punta Gorda near Pirate Harbor at 20:35 UTC with  winds.

Ian weakened to Category 3 strength at 23:00 UTC the same day. Continual land interaction resulted in the frictional displacement of the system, and that coupled with high vertical wind shear caused Ian to quickly degrade to a tropical storm by 09:00 UTC as it moved north-northeast off of the eastern Florida coastline. At 21:00 UTC, the system's low-level circulation had completely emerged off of the coast of Florida, and although the convection was slightly offset to the north, Ian intensified to a category 1 hurricane later that same day. The system turned northward on the morning of September 30 and accelerated toward the South Carolina coast. It strengthened some during this time, as deep convection re-developed near the center and hybrid frontal features moved away. Ian began to weaken inland and transitioned into a post-tropical cyclone over coastal South Carolina three hours after landfall. As the polar jet stream ripped the cyclone apart, it later dissipated over southern Virginia at 03:00 UTC on October 2.

Preparations

Caribbean

Jamaica 
The Meteorological Service of Jamaica issued tropical storm watches for the island of Jamaica on September 23. Flood warnings and marine warnings were issued simultaneously.

Cayman Islands 
The government of the Cayman Islands issued hurricane watches for its three islands–Grand Cayman, Cayman Brac, and Little Cayman–on September 23 at 21:00 UTC as Ian was projected to pass over the British Overseas Territory as a hurricane. The National Emergency Operations Centre had gone into full activation mode. Along with the emergency services, the Cayman Islands Regiment and Cayman Islands Coast Guard saw the full mobilization and deployment of their personnel. In addition, the Governor of the Cayman Islands, Martyn Roper, requested for the United Kingdom to further deploy additional military assets to the islands for Humanitarian Aid and Disaster Relief Operations. Subsequently, HMS Medway was deployed to the Cayman Islands. Helicopters from Royal Cayman Islands Police Service were also deployed to assist in the operation. At the time one of the helicopters was deployed to the Turks and Caicos Islands before the development of Ian to assist recovery efforts there after the passage of Hurricane Fiona. The Royal Navy also deployed its helicopter to assist. Schools, universities, and education centers closed on the evening of September 23. On September 24 at 18:00 UTC, the hurricane watch for Grand Cayman was upgraded to a hurricane warning, and the hurricane watch for Cayman Brac and Little Cayman was changed to a tropical storm watch. Flood warnings along with marine warnings were also issued for Grand Cayman. The Cayman Islands Airports Authority continued operating the airports until the afternoon of September 25. Then the airports closed and the aircraft at the airports were evacuated.

Cuba 

Authorities in Cuba issued evacuation orders for around 50,000 people in the Pinar del Rio province and set up around 55 shelters before the storm. State media stated that steps were being taken to protect food and crops in warehouses. Locals removed fishing boats in Havana, and city workers inspected and unclogged storm drains.

United States 

Amtrak suspended its Auto Train service for September 27–28 and truncated the September 26 southbound Silver Star service, which was already on a modified schedule due to the suspension of the Silver Meteor service, at Jacksonville, Florida, on September 27. Silver Star service was canceled for September 27–28 with the northbound Silver Star for September 29 also canceled. Ian's updated track forecast then prompted them to suspend those services through October 1. Palmetto service was also truncated for Washington D.C. on September 30 and October 1. As Ian dissipated over the Carolinas, Amtrak modified its schedule, truncating the October 2 southbound Silver Star at Jacksonville, which would be the origin of the October 3 northbound Silver Star. Bus transportation was provided for Orlando and Tampa. Additionally, the resumption of the Silver Meteor service, which had been suspended since January 24, 2022, due to a resurgence of the Omicron variant of COVID-19, was pushed back from October 3 to 11. The modified schedule and the resumption of service for the Silver Meteor was then pushed out to October 13 due to the extensive damage inflicted along the Central Florida Rail Corridor. Full resumptions of both of these services would occur over a period from October 14–17.

The ninth public hearing of the United States House Select Committee on the January 6 Attack, scheduled for September 28 was postponed. The governors of North Carolina, South Carolina, and Virginia declared a state of emergency in preparation for the incoming storm. Over 3,500 flights were canceled as a direct result of Ian. Amazon canceled warehouse operations in some facilities.

Florida 
On September 24, Governor Ron DeSantis declared a state of emergency for all of Florida. Tampa Bay area schools also announced closures, and several colleges and universities, including the University of South Florida, the University of Tampa, and Eckerd College announced that they were canceling classes and closing. By September 27, 55 public school districts across the state announced cancellations, many through the end of the week. Officials at the Kennedy Space Center delayed the launch of NASA's Artemis 1, and the rocket was returned to the Vehicle Assembly Building. President Joe Biden approved a state of emergency declaration for Florida on September 24. Many airports and ports in Tampa, Tampa Bay, Orlando, St. Petersburg, Key West, and other places announced that they would be suspending operations. Walt Disney World and Universal Orlando said that they would be closing attractions. A number of stores and restaurants like Walmart and Waffle House were closed because of the impending dangerous weather.
Mandatory evacuation orders were issued for parts of multiple counties. Around 300,000 people were evacuated in Hillsborough County (which centers on Tampa) with schools and other locations being used as shelters. Before the impact school closures and mandatory evacuations were made across much of the Florida peninsula. DeSantis mobilized 5,000 Florida state national guard troops. Another 2,000 were deployed on standby in neighboring states. Officials in Tallahassee and nearby cities commissioned the monitoring of local power lines and scouring of storm-water systems to make sure them prepared and secure.

The college football game between the East Carolina Pirates and the South Florida Bulls was moved from South Florida's stadium in Tampa to Boca Raton. The Tampa Bay Buccaneers of the National Football League moved practices from Tampa south to the Miami Dolphins training facility in Miami Gardens.

All three national parks in Florida closed in preparation for the hurricane. The Florida section of Gulf Islands National Seashore was also closed.

Georgia 
Governor Brian Kemp ordered the activation of the State Operations Center on September 26 which began preparations for the impact of the storm in the later part of the week. Many farmers prepared before the storm by turning off irrigation systems attempting to dry out the ground while harvesting what they could (much of the state's cotton crop had not been harvested yet). Atlanta Motor Speedway opened their campgrounds to hurricane evacuees.

South Carolina 
Governor Henry McMaster declared a state of emergency and activated the emergency operations plan for the state. The college football game between the South Carolina State Bulldogs and South Carolina Gamecocks scheduled for October 1 at 12:00 p.m. was moved up to September 29 at 7:00 p.m. on account of the storm. On September 29, the National Park Service announced that Congaree National Park will be closed until at least October 2. The National Forest Service, meanwhile, closed both Francis Marion National Forest and Sumter National Forest. On September 30, the Weather Prediction Center issued a moderate risk of excessive rainfall for a large portion of South Carolina and North Carolina. In the afternoon of September30, Hurricane Ian made landfall just south of Georgetown, South Carolina causing moderate flooding in the streets.

Alabama and North Carolina 
Talladega Superspeedway in Alabama and Charlotte Motor Speedway in North Carolina opened their campgrounds to hurricane evacuees.

Bahamas 
The eastward shift in Ian's track as well as the increasing size of the hurricane prompted the issuance of a tropical storm warning for Bimini and Grand Bahama in The Bahamas late on September 27.

Impact

Caribbean

Caribbean South America 
The disturbance brought gusty winds and heavy rain to Trinidad and Tobago, the ABC islands, and to the northern coasts of Venezuela and Colombia, causing flooding and minor damage.

Cayman Islands 
Minimal impacts were felt on the Cayman Islands as the storm passed to its west. The all-clear for the Islands was called at 3:00 pm. EDT on September 26 from the National Emergency Operations Center. Minor damage and scattered power outages were also reported.

Cuba 
Striking western Cuba as a Category 3 hurricane, Ian caused extensive damage throughout Pinar del Río and Mayabeque provinces. The storm made landfall at 4:30 local time on September 27, in Pinar del Río. Significant storm surge inundation occurred along the coasts of the Gulf of Guanahacabibes and Isla de la Juventud. Ian caused a power outage in Pinar del Río, cutting power to the entire province, which had a population of 850,000. Five people were killed in Cuba: a man in San Juan y Martínez who was electrocuted while disconnecting a wind turbine used for irrigating his field, a 43-year-old woman who died when one of the walls of her house collapsed, two state technicians who were working on repairing breakdowns caused by Ian, and a fifth person of unknown cause.

In the early morning of September 28, the storm knocked out power to the entirety of Cuba after a collapse of its power grid; it left 11 million people without power.

United States

Florida 

On September 29, Lee County Sheriff Carmine Marceno, whose jurisdiction covers Cape Coral and Fort Myers, estimated that thousands of people may still be trapped in floodwaters. President Biden said the storm could end up as the deadliest in Florida's history. In an interview on September 29, Marceno said that hundreds of deaths may have occurred, but he and Governor DeSantis later downplayed the remark.

As of January 13, 149 people were confirmed dead state-wide from Ian by the Florida Medical Examiners Commission; 72 of those deaths occurred in Lee County, and 9 occurred in neighboring Charlotte County. In the Florida Keys, seven Cuban migrants drowned when their boat capsized off Stock Island, in Monroe County, as Ian moved through; 11 others were missing. In addition, ten people died in Sarasota and Collier Counties; seven in Monroe and Volusia Counties; five in Hillsborough, Manatee, and Osceola Counties; four in Hardee County; three in Orange and Putnam Counties; two each in Hendry and Polk Counties; and one each in DeSoto, Lake, and Martin, Miami-Dade and St. Lucie Counties. Ian also caused two indirect deaths in Sarasota County, a 94-year-old man, and an 80-year-old woman, both due to disabled oxygen machines that they were using. Another from Lee County reportedly died by suicide after seeing the extent of damage done to his property after the storm.

Overall, more than 2.4 million people in Florida lost power during the storm and in its aftermath.

Florida Keys and the Gold Coast

Tropical-storm-force winds were observed at Key West International Airport before 22:00 UTC (18:00 EDT) the same day; the city of Key West subsequently recorded its third-highest storm surge since 1913. Coastal flooding impacted 93 homes, with 38 experiencing substantial damage and 55 others suffering minor damage, while several cars on the south side of the Truman Annex were flooded. Residents of approximately 24 family units in that neighborhood fled their dwellings due to rising floodwaters. Additionally, a fire ignited during the storm demolished 14 business and 14 residential units. The southwest side of Stock Island reported several impassable streets and widespread flood damage to sheds and outbuildings. Similar impacts occurred on islands north of there through Big Pine Key. Almost 10,000 customers beyond the west end of the Seven Mile Bridge lost power, roughly one-third of electrical subscribers in the Lower Florida Keys. Storm surge flooding farther north briefly left some streets impassible, while winds caused isolated and sporadic power outages. Throughout the Florida Keys, the hurricane ripped about 150 vessels loose from their moorings.

Several tornadoes touched down in South Florida as the storm approached on September 27–28; 12 tornadoes touched down with all but one of them occurring in the Miami metropolitan area. One EF1 tornado severely damaged over 20 aircraft and several hangars at the North Perry Airport in Broward County; additional structures and trees were also damaged. An EF2 tornado on the night of September 27 overturned multiple cars, shattered windows, damaged several roofs, and toppled a large tree onto an apartment building at Kings Point in Palm Beach County, injuring two people. Another EF1 tornado damaged several roofs and caused some significant tree damage in Wellington and Loxahatchee. The same storm quickly produced another EF1 tornado as the first one dissipated; damage was inflicted to trees and the roofs of a stable and a house. The other tornadoes were rated EFU-EF0. Wind gusts reportedly did not exceed  in the Gold Coast, but some minor wind damage was reported and power outages in the tri-county area affected 15,632 customers.

Southwest Florida

The National Hurricane Center's advisory at 15:00 UTC warned that the "extremely dangerous eyewall of Ian" is "moving onshore."

Ian pushed a destructive  storm surge inland, primarily south of where its eye made landfall. In Naples rising coastal floodwaters trapped people and prompted numerous calls for rescue. Water entered the first floor of several parking garages, impacting many cars. A fire station was completely flooded, substantially damaging nearly all of the equipment in the building. Damages in Naples alone was estimated at $989 million. The ambulance bay and helipad were inundated at a hospital in North Naples. Multiple rescues occurred in Goodland after some people unsuccessfully attempted to flee the storm surge. Farther inland  of water covered portions of US 41 near Carnestown. Aside from Naples Ian caused $256 million in damages in Marco Island, $7.1 million in Everglades City, and $948 million in unincorporated areas. Throughout the county, the hurricane caused major impacts to 3,515 commercial and residential structures and demolished 33 others. Building damages alone in Collier County totaled about $2.2 billion.

Lee County experienced catastrophic impacts from Ian, particularly due to storm surge. Combined with high winds this resulted in damage to 52,514 buildings and homes, which included minor damage to 16,314 structures, major damage to 14,245 structures, and the destruction of 5,369 others. A preliminary estimate placed building damages at $6.8 billion. A large portion of the Sanibel Causeway collapsed and washed away during the storm, cutting off all vehicle access to Sanibel. Vehicular access to the island was re-established on October 11 for emergency workers and public access was re-established October 21 for local residents. This cut off the J. N. "Ding" Darling National Wildlife Refuge, forcing them to temporarily close. The hurricane damaged the Matlacha Bridge and washed out the approach to it which connected Pine Island to the mainland. A temporary bridge was opened for public use on October 5. Both the Sanibel Causeway and the Matlacha Bridge are eligible for federal bridge rehabilitation funds. Strong winds also resulted in a widespread downing of electrical poles, trees and tree limbs, road signs, and traffic signals. Consequently, there were significant disruptions in communication and electrical services; falling debris blocked many roadways.

Winds affected 112 structures in Hendry County, with damages estimated at $419,000. Parts of Glades County likely experienced hurricane-force wind gusts, destroying 3 structures, causing major damage to 14 structures and inflicting minor damage on 25 others. An EF0 tornado in Moore Haven damaged trees and homes and tipped over two storage trailers. The hurricane destroyed more than 200 homes in Charlotte County. Nearby Sarasota County reported extensive tree and structural damage due to wind, as well as significant flooding in inland areas. A  portion of I-75 was forced to close on Friday as the Myakka River flooded the highway. Venice turned off the water supply to the island of Venice, which has since been restored. Ian brought similar conditions to Manatee County. The cyclone destroyed 10 structures there, 297 structures were majorly impacted, and 891 others had minor impacts. There was about $1.1 billion in damages in Manatee County. Several counties inland experienced heavy rains during Ian. In Hardee County, the Peace River crested at a record height of  near Zolfo Springs, while wind gusts reached  in Wauchula. The county also reported minor damage to 367 buildings and homes, major damage to 114 buildings and homes, and the destruction of 18 others. Ian spawned a brief tornado in Lake Placid and possibly another in Sebring.

Central Florida
Strong winds in Okeechobee County caused minor damage to 113 structures, major damage to 35 structures, and the destruction of 2 structures. Damages there reached about $1.4 million. Martin County reported mostly isolated wind impacts, which included damage to a mobile home and a tree falling onto a residence at a fishing camp along Lake Okeechobee. Along the coast, erosion damages totaled about $6 million. Hundreds of sea turtle eggs were destroyed and scattered across the Fort Pierce beach. In Osceola County, severe flooding affected or damaged some 900 businesses and 3,200 dwellings, leading to around $148 million in private property damages. The worst of the floods in the county occurred near Lake Center and in parts of Kissimmee and St. Cloud. Around 35% of customers lost electricity, while wind damage varied from isolated in Lakeland to much more commonplace in Fort Meade and Frostproof. Overall, Ian caused minor damage to 799 structures and major damage to 192 others in the county.

Most neighborhoods in Orlando were flooded as many of the city's numerous lakes overflowed, with the city receiving  of rain. About 250 people were rescued. This heavy rain, combined with Hurricane Nicole in November, led to Orlando recording their wettest meteorological autumn on record in 2022. Near the University of Central Florida, hundreds of students were displaced after several nearby off-campus apartment complexes flooded. Property damages in Orange County were estimated at $206 million. In Seminole County, extensive floods occurred in areas adjacent to the Little Wekiva River in Altamonte Springs, the St. Johns River at Lake Harney and in Sanford, and the larger and smaller branches of the Econlockhatchee River near Oviedo. Ian destroyed 2 structures, caused major damage to 1,076 structures, and inflicted minor impacts on 580 others. Damages in Seminole County totaled about $241 million. Heavy precipitation inundated many areas along the St. Johns River in Lake County, particularly around Astor. The cyclone caused minor damage to 61 structures and major impacts to 49 others, with damages in the county estimated at $4.5 million. Severe flooding also occurred to the east in Volusia County, especially adjacent to Lake Monroe and the St. Johns River. Along the coast, the storm surge caused extensive impacts to seawalls in the vicinity of Daytona Beach. In New Smyrna Beach, about 180 residents had to be evacuated due to rising floodwaters, with the coastal town receiving almost  of rain according to a preliminary report released by the National Weather Service. Around 247,000 customers lost power during the storm in Volusia County alone. The hurricane caused minor impacts to 1,197 structures, major impacts to 181 structures, and the destruction of 40 others. Damages in Volusia County were estimated at $128 million. Near June Park to the west of Melbourne, Ian spawned a weak EF0 tornado that damaged only trees and no buildings. Storm surge and high tides in Brevard County caused about $7 million in damage to dunes and beach crossovers.

Elsewhere in Florida

Although the storm was a considerable threat to the Tampa Bay area, Ian remained well south of the region. Damages in Hillsborough County totaled $54.8 million. A total of 191,415 customers lost electricity, over one-third of the county. Overall, 31 dwellings reported major damage and 86 others suffered minor damage. Ian caused $22.6 million in damages throughout Pinellas County. Areas north of Tampa reported minor or sporadic wind damage, including some tree damage and a loss of shingles in Pasco, Citrus, and Levy counties. The Tampa Bay Lightning hockey team was forced to postpone two preseason games due to the storm.

Portions of the First Coast experienced strong winds, heavy rains, and significant storm surge heights that rivaled those observed during Hurricane Irma. In Flagler County, storm surge and high tides substantially damaged the Flagler Beach pier, rendered a few coastal roads impassable, and flooded home in Flagler Beach, lab buildings in Marineland, and a restaurant in Bunnell. Heavy precipitation and storm surge in St. Johns County flooded several roads in St. Augustine and resulted in the temporary closure of the Bridge of Lions. Floodwaters entered some homes in the Davis Shores neighborhood of Anastasia Island. In Duval County, several locations reported storm surge inundation, including along the Intracoastal Waterway and in Jacksonville's Riverside neighborhood. Widespread power outages and isolated wind damage also occurred, such as several trees downed at Naval Air Station Jacksonville, some of which struck homes, displacing two families. In Nassau County, the storm surge resulted in damage to Fernandina Beach High School and the Fernandina Beach marina and inundated numerous roads on Piney Island near the Amelia River. Abnormally high tides, storm surge, and tropical-storm-force winds in Putnam County caused flooding in areas by Lake George and the St. Johns River, with water entering dozens of residences in Fruitland, Satsuma, and Welaka.

South Carolina 

By 3:00 pm EDT on September 30, over 210,000 customers had lost power in the state from the hurricane. A tidal gauge at Springmaid Pier in Myrtle Beach reached , beating the record of  set by Hurricane Isaias which struck two years prior. As of 11:00 am EDT on October 1, an estimated 63,000 customers remained without power, primarily in Horry, Georgetown, Charleston, Florence, Williamsburg, and Berkeley Counties.

North Carolina 
 By 3:30 pm EDT on September 30, over 76,000 people had lost power in the state, with 65,000 in Wake County alone. An EF0 tornado also touched down in Holden Beach, damaging multiple homes in the town, while an EFU tornado touched down northeast of Aurora. There were five storm-related deaths in the state: three in Johnston County, one in Martin County, and one in Moore County.

Elsewhere
Strong winds and rain swept through the Mid-Atlantic region. 95,000 thousand people lost power in Virginia. In Washington, D.C., a baseball game between the Philadelphia Phillies and Washington Nationals was postponed. A baseball game in Baltimore between the Baltimore Orioles and Toronto Blue Jays was also postponed. Wind gusts in Delaware reached  in Dewey Beach.

The remnant low-pressure area of Ian stalled off the coast of New Jersey for nearly a week. Widespread coastal flooding occurred along the Jersey Shore, with Sea Isle City receiving  of rain between October 1 and 3. AccuWeather described the system as a nor'easter which produced storm surge levels comparable to those of Hurricane Sandy. The rainfall alleviated drought conditions throughout much of New Jersey, and lasted until October 5. Several ferries between Cape May, New Jersey and Lewes, Delaware were cancelled due to the storm on October 3. Due to the storm drenching New Jersey, the state realized their tenth wettest October on record. Minor coastal flooding occurred in New York City as well. Bronx Fit Fest, originally scheduled for October 1, was cancelled.

Aftermath

Cuba 
Mass power outages and a nationwide blackout led to protests in Cuba, with at least 400 demonstrators demanding the central government restore power and Internet access. A rare request of emergency assistance from the U.S. was approved by Biden on September 30 after Ian passed. The European Union announced a package of €1 million in aid while the Ministry of Foreign Affairs and Worship of Argentina sent pills for the potabilization of nearly one million liters of water via the White Helmets Commission. The government of Japan also dispatched help to Cuba through its Japan International Cooperation Agency agency.

United States 

Soon after the conditions improved in impacted parts of Florida, search and rescue teams, first responders, and utility workers from un-impacted parts of Florida and across the country deployed to the area. The American Red Cross mobilized and began to provide shelter and supplies to those who needed it as well. Various other International, federal and local organizations also mobilized to help spread donations throughout affected populations in the form of both monetary and physical donations. On October 3, The Guardian reported 10,000 people remained unaccounted for. However, the next day, FEMA's statement did not include numbers about people remaining unaccounted for.

There were sporadic reports of looting and burglaries at several businesses in Lee County, Florida; alleged thefts of non-essential items such as sports apparel and athletic shoes during the height of the storm prompted officials to enforce a curfew in the county. According to DeSantis, Florida was working with SpaceX CEO Elon Musk to use the Starlink satellite Internet service to help restore communication across the state.

At least eight school districts suffered closures as a result of Ian. The Lee County and DeSoto County Public School Districts reopened on October 17. The Charlotte County Public School District reopened October 18.

Critics have noted that federally subsidized flood insurance is one of the reasons that people continue to move to hurricane-prone areas of Florida.  Since the National Flood Insurance Program (NFIP) began, millions of people moved to Florida in the past 50 years into areas that were part of Hurricane Ian's path in part, critics note, due to the subsidized flood insurance offered by the federal government and insurance companies.

Lee County also saw a sharp rise in infections and death from flesh-eating bacteria that live in warm brackish water. By October 18, 29 illnesses and four deaths had been recorded since landfall due to infection from Vibrio vulnificus, at least one of whom was from out of state.

Weeks later several coastside condominiums and hotels damaged by Ian in Volusia County were deemed unsafe and evacuated as Hurricane Nicole approached on November 10. Many structures fell into the ocean.

Damage estimates

Preliminary estimates of damages from Hurricane Ian are wide-ranging. Various analytic agencies and insurance companies have placed losses in the tens of billions. CoreLogic reported potential insured losses at $28–47 billion. Verisk Analytics indicated a total of $42–57 billion and potentially over $60 billion when losses not covered under the NFIP are included. Moody's Analytics calculated potential damages of $45–55 billion in Florida alone with billions more in South Carolina. Total economic losses were estimated at $56 billion by Enki Research. Karen Clark & Co. placed insured damages at nearly $63 billion with total economic losses over $100 billion. On October 10, Risk Management Solutions, a subsidiary of Moody's Corporation, placed private market damages at $53–74 billion with an additional $10 billion from the NFIP. Beyond physical and economic losses, The Triple-I Corporation estimated litigation costs in Florida would reach $10–20 billion.

On January 10, 2023, the National Oceanic and Atmospheric Administration estimated total losses at $112 billion, making Ian the costliest hurricane in Florida's history, surpassing Hurricane Irma, as well as the third-costliest in US history. Ian marked the 15th billion-dollar disaster for the country in 2022.

Depiction in media 
The storm had heavy coverage in both traditional media and social media. Coverage of Hurricane Ian was the most viewed by cable viewership on September 28 with the Weather Channel occupying eight of the top ten cable spots with continuous coverage of the storm. Fox Weather, the weather streaming service from Fox News reported an average of 552,000 viewers on September 28 between 1:00-4:00 pm ET when the storm made landfall in Florida. This was by far their most ever daily views. Internet personality Ryan Hall, Y'all was ranked number three on YouTube during a livestream covering Ian's landfall on September 29.

Photos and videos of the hurricane were posted throughout social media with a large amount seen on TikTok where videos posted under the hashtag #HurricaneIan had about 3.5 billion views by September 28, while on Instagram there were more than 65,000 posts with the same hashtag. Others provided livestream feeds of their homes and surrounding areas during the hurricane. Many Floridians who posted about the storm to social media found humor while discussing preparing for the hurricane, the storm, and its aftermath. Some people who sheltered in place at Walt Disney World documented or livestreamed their experiences and the storm, and in some cases monetized the videos which drew criticism from many. In one case a Floridian YouTuber's video was disliked more than double the number of times it was liked on the platform.

Many asked for help on social media looking for loved ones after losing contact with them or getting pleas from them for aid. While Florida authorities urged Floridians to use official emergency channels to report emergencies and to limit personal information that could be shared, many discovered informal digital structures or relied on ones from previous disasters to help provide aid or finding missing individuals.

See also 
 Weather of 2022
 Tropical cyclones in 2022
 List of Category 4 Atlantic hurricanes
 List of Florida hurricanes (2000–present)
 Timeline of the 2022 Atlantic hurricane season
 List of costliest Atlantic hurricanes

Historic comparisons to Ian
 1846 Havana hurricane – large and intense hurricane that took a similar track to Ian
 1928 Okeechobee hurricane – A destructive Category 5 hurricane that killed approximately 2,500 people in Florida
 September 1948 Florida hurricane – Category 4 hurricane which tracked across Cuba and made landfall in Southwest Florida
 Hurricane Donna (1960) – Category 4 hurricane that took a similar track through Florida
 Hurricane Gladys (1968) – Category 2 hurricane with a similar track to Ian 
 Hurricane Charley (2004) – Category 4 hurricane that took a near-identical track to Ian and rapidly intensified similarly 
 Hurricane Irma (2017) – Category 5 hurricane which also severely affected Southwest Florida
 Hurricane Nicole (2022) – Category 1 hurricane that further affected Florida in the areas that were already affected by Ian a month later.

Notes

References

External links 

 The National Hurricane Center's advisory archive on Hurricane Ian
 How to help victims of Hurricane Ian in Florida by Gabriel Pietrorazio, published by PBS (2022-09-29)

Ian
Ian
 
2022 in Cuba
2022 in Florida
2022 in Jamaica
2022 in the Cayman Islands
September 2022 events in North America
Ian 2022
Ian 2022
Ian 2022
Hurricanes in South Carolina
Ian 2022
Ian
2022 natural disasters in the United States
2022 disasters in North America
Fort Myers, Florida
Naples, Florida
Disasters in Florida
Disasters in Cuba
Disasters in the Bahamas
September 2022 events in the United States
October 2022 events in the United States
2022 floods in the United States